The Transportation Infrastructure Finance and Innovation Act (TIFIA) is a U.S. federal government program run through the United States Department of Transportation to provides credit assistance for qualified regional and national surface transportation projects in the United States. Projects include highways, city passenger railways, some freight rail, intermodal freight transfer facilities, and some port terminal projects.

The program was reauthorized in the FAST Act, a bill passed by Congress.

Cost 
Federal authorizations per year are:

History 
TIFIA was passed by Congress in 1998 with the goal of leveraging federal dollars and attract private and non-federal capital into transportation infrastructure.

How it works 
TIFIA is run by the U.S. Department of Transportation’s (DOT) Office of Innovative Program Delivery. The program provides "loans, loan guarantees, and lines of credit to qualified public or private borrowers, including state governments, private firms, special authorities, local governments, transportation improvement districts, or a consortium these entities, such as public‐private partnerships."

Projects must be greater than $50 million to qualify. The program offers:
 A 35-year fixed rate loan for up to 33 percent of the cost of the project
 Non-variable interest rates
 Deferral payment options of up to five years after completion of the project
 Ongoing debt service

Influence 
The TIFIA has served as a model for other types of development projects. For example, in 2016, North America's Building Trades Unions (NABTU) publicly called on President Obama to adopt a major infrastructure investment program. NABTU has also recommended an increase in investments in nuclear power and the implementation of an Energy Infrastructure Finance and Innovation program based on the Transportation Infrastructure Finance and Innovation Act.

References

United States federal transportation legislation